The Phaedra complex is an informal, non-scientific designation to the sexual desire of a stepmother for her stepson, though the term has been extended to cover difficult relationships between stepparents and stepchildren in general.

Origins

The complex takes its name from Greek mythology. 
Phaedra was the daughter of Minos and Pasiphaë, wife of Theseus, sister of Ariadne, and the mother of Demophon of Athens and Acamas. Though married to Theseus, Phaedra fell in love with Hippolytus, Theseus' son born by either Hippolyta, queen of the Amazons, or Antiope, her sister.

When Hippolytus refused Phaedra's advances, she falsely accused him of propositioning her. Phaedra eventually killed herself in remorse after his subsequent death.

Cultural analogues
 Amata in the Aeneid has been seen as cognate to Phaedra in her love for her future son-in-law Turnus and her eventual suicide at the news of his death.
 In the  Hebrew Bible Zuleikha made a pass at her adoptive son Joseph, but Joseph refused her. So, Zuleikha accused Joseph of rape and he was put in prison, but eventually released. According to the tradition, Zuleikha made advances at many other foster children before Joseph.
 In the ballad Child Owlet, Lady Erskine propositions her nephew, and upon rebuttal accuses him of attempting to seduce her, leading to his murder.

Other use

 French philosopher Georges Bataille used the same term in a very different sense to describe the morbid desire for a corpse.

See also
Covert incest
Jocasta complex
Parentification

References

Further reading
Alberto Moravia, The Lie (1966)
Mary Renault, The Bull from the Sea (1962)

Psychoanalytic terminology
Complex (psychology)
Greek mythology
Incest